Pulvilli are soft, cushionlike pads on the feet of insects and other arthropods, such as the housefly and ixodid ticks. They are located at the base of the claws (#2 in the figure at right).

The pulvilli function as an adhesive system. Their sticking power comes partly from Van der Waals force, and partly from an adhesive fluid secreted from the extremities onto surfaces.

References 

Insect morphology